The Gibraltar territory currently contains an  long section of the isthmus that links the Rock with mainland Spain. Spain does not acknowledge British sovereignty over Gibraltar beyond the fortified perimeter of the town as at 1704. The United Kingdom claims the southern part of the isthmus on the basis of continuous possession over a long period.

As well as the airport, there are two substantial housing estates, a sports stadium, a secondary school, a marina, and a beach on this land, which de facto is an integral part of the territory of Gibraltar.

Positions of each side 
One of the sources of the dispute is the lack of appropriate definitions of what had been actually ceded to Great Britain. The Treaty of Utrecht did not include any map or specific description of the ceded elements, so that Article X is subject to different interpretations from each side. According to Article X of the Treaty of Utrecht, dominion is ceded over the town and castle of Gibraltar, together with the port, fortifications, and forts thereunto belonging.

Spanish position 

Spain does not acknowledge British sovereignty over Gibraltar, as they consider that the only part that was ceded was the fortified perimeter of the city, and the rest had no territorial jurisdiction (the literal phrase of the treaty is "the Catholic King wills, and takes it to be understood that the above-named propriety be yielded to Great Britain without any territorial jurisdiction"). Therefore, the Treaty would not have ceded any part of the isthmus. Spain considers that such an area was occupied by the UK since the 19th century (1815), and such "occupation of the isthmus [by the United Kingdom] is illegal and against the principles of the international law". For said reason, British sovereignty is not acknowledged by Spain, considering itself instead to be owner of the territory (see map).

The British informed Spain of its intention to build barracks on the isthmus' neutral ground in 1815, which Spain agreed to for the duration of, and in order to assist in dealing with, a yellow fever epidemic in Gibraltar, and the buildings remained thereafter. 
The airport was built unilaterally by the British on another section of neutral ground in 1938, while Spain was fighting a civil war, thus further reducing the original size of the neutral ground.

Referring to the current demarcation, Spanish official terminology always uses the word "fence" (verja in Spanish) instead of "frontier" or "border", since it does not acknowledge the possibility of having a frontier with what Spain considers to be its own territory.

British position 
The United Kingdom relies on de facto arguments of possession by prescription in relation to the southern part of the isthmus, as there has been "continuous possession [of the isthmus] over a long period".

On December 2, 1987, in a joint British-Spanish declaration about the use of the airport, as well as in several EU acts, the UK has acknowledged that Spain disputes the sovereignty of the isthmus (The ... arrangements ... are understood to be without prejudice to the respective legal positions of Spain and the United Kingdom with regard to the dispute over sovereignty over the territory in which the airport is situated.), although they reject the basis for that dispute.

The Gibraltar government rejects Spain's argument in its entirety. They point out that as "Utrecht" ceded "the town and castle of Gibraltar, together with the port, fortifications, and forts thereunto belonging" and there were such "fortifications and forts" along the line of the current frontier (Devil's Tower, El Molino), then this area was included in the cession.

Furthermore, they argue, international practice at the time was that all territorial cessions included an extended surrounding area equivalent to the length of two cannon shots. When the treaty of Seville was concluded between Great Britain, France and Spain in 1729, long arguments ensued between Spain and Britain as to how far north the 'undoubted right' of Britain extended from the north face of the Rock of Gibraltar. It was finally accepted that a distance of 600 Toises, being more than two cannon shots distance between the British guns and the Spanish guns, would be considered “the neutral ground”.

In either case, the United Kingdom further bases its claim upon what they consider to be established legal precedents that grant property rights over an area that is continually occupied and made sole use of, for an extended period. In practice, the land is now an integral part of the territory of Gibraltar on one side, and similarly on the Spanish side, and, although there may be a line on the map, there is no longer any indication of the boundary of the 'neutral ground'.

Maps show the evolution of the British occupation of the isthmus as well as the location of the two items that, according to the Gibraltarian government, were part of the forts ceded in the Treaty of Utrecht (Torre del Diablo, Devil's Tower, and Molino).  The Torre del Molino is marked with an "F".

In practice Gibraltar begins at the frontier/fence and the 'neutral land' to the north has been absorbed into the town of La Linea, and that to the south is an integral part of Gibraltar.

See also 
Disputed status of Gibraltar

References

Sources

 Chapter 2, "La lucha por Gibraltar" (The Struggle for Gibraltar) is available online (PDF)

Politics of Gibraltar
Spain–United Kingdom relations
Gibraltar–Spain border
Gibraltar